Todor Todorov may refer to:

 Todor Todorov (bobsleigh) (born 1961), Bulgarian bobsledder
 Todor Todorov (gymnast) (born 1928), Bulgarian Olympic gymnast
 Todor Todorov (sculptor) (born 1951), Bulgarian sculptor
 Todor Todorov (footballer, born May 1982), Bulgarian football goalkeeper
 Todor Todorov (footballer, born November 1982), Bulgarian football defender
 Todor Todorov (weightlifter) (born 1948), Bulgarian Olympic weightlifter